Cindy Carquillat (born 13 July 1986 in Bienne, Switzerland) is a Swiss figure skater. She won first place in the 2004 national championship, but didn't reach the minimum note of 4.8 to get a medal or the title of Swiss champion. In 2005 and 2006 she was the national bronze medallist.

External links

References

Swiss female single skaters
Figure skaters at the 2007 Winter Universiade
Living people
1986 births
People from Biel/Bienne
Sportspeople from the canton of Bern